Renáta Katona (born 17 November 1994) is a Hungarian fencer. She competed in the women's sabre event at the 2020 Summer Olympics in Tokyo, Japan.

In 2017, she won the silver medal in the women's team sabre at the Summer Universiade held in Taipei, Taiwan.

References

External links 
 

Living people
1994 births
Place of birth missing (living people)
Hungarian female sabre fencers
Universiade medalists in fencing
Universiade silver medalists for Hungary
Medalists at the 2017 Summer Universiade
Fencers at the 2020 Summer Olympics
Olympic fencers of Hungary
World Fencing Championships medalists
21st-century Hungarian women